The 2010–11 IFA Premiership (known as the Carling Premiership for sponsorship reasons) was the third season since its establishment after a major overhaul of the league system in Northern Ireland, and the 110th season of Irish league football overall. The season began on 7 August 2010, and concluded on 30 April 2011.

Linfield were crowned champions for the second successive season, after a 4–0 win over Lisburn Distillery on 26 April 2011. This was Linfield's 50th Irish League title.

The same day, Newry City were relegated to IFA Championship 1 after a 4–0 loss to Glenavon.

Teams
After a two-legged play-off against 2009–10 Championship 1 runners-up Donegal Celtic, Institute were relegated to the 2010–11 IFA Championship after an aggregate 1–0 loss, with Donegal Celtic taking their place for this season's IFA Premiership.

2009–10 IFA Championship 1 winners Loughgall were not eligible for promotion as they were not awarded the required domestic licence by the IFA.

Stadia and locations

League table

Results

Matches 1–22
During matches 1–22 each team played every other team twice (home and away).

Matches 23–33
During matches 23–33 each team played every other team for the third time (either at home, or away).

Matches 34–38
During matches 34–38 each team played every other team in their half of the table once. As this was the fourth time that teams played each other this season, home sides in this round were chosen so that teams had played each other twice at home and twice away.

Section A

Section B

Promotion/relegation
The promotion/relegation play-off was not played this season, because Championship 1 runners-up Limavady United were not eligible for promotion as they did not hold a domestic licence. This meant that Newry City were automatically relegated, with Championship 1 winners Carrick Rangers replacing them in next season's Premiership.

Top goalscorers

IFA Premiership clubs in Europe 2010–11

UEFA coefficient and ranking
For the 2010–11 UEFA competitions, the associations were allocated places according to their 2009 UEFA country coefficients, which took into account their performance in European competitions from 2004–05 to 2008–09. In the 2009 rankings used for this season's European competitions, Northern Ireland's coefficient points total was 2.165. After earning a score of 0.333 during the 2008–09 European campaign, the league was ranked by UEFA as the 47th best league in Europe out of 53 - falling one place from 46th the previous season. This season Northern Ireland earned 1.125 points, which was added to the points total for the 2011 rankings used in 2012–13 UEFA competitions.

 45  Armenia 2.999
 46  Wales 2.331
 47  Northern Ireland 2.165
 48  Faroe Islands 2.165
 49  Luxembourg 1.332
 Full list

UEFA Champions League
After winning the league last season, Linfield were the league's sole representatives in the UEFA Champions League. They entered in the second qualifying round, and were drawn against Norwegian side Rosenborg. Despite being massive underdogs, Linfield recorded an unexpected 0–0 draw in the first leg at Windsor Park. However they were beaten 2–0 in the return leg in Norway, and exited the competition.

UEFA Europa League
Portadown earned a place in the first qualifying round of the UEFA Europa League because Irish Cup winners Linfield had already qualified for the UEFA Champions League as league champions. They entered the first qualifying round with 2009–10's third placed team, Glentoran. Portadown were drawn with Latvian side Skonto Riga, who were knocked out by League of Ireland side Derry City in the 2009–10 UEFA Europa League. Glentoran were handed a tie with Icelandic club KR Reykjavik. The first legs gave mixed results, with Portadown getting a creditable 1–1 draw at home while Glentoran being defeated 3–0 in Iceland. Glentoran were knocked out in the second leg despite a battling 2–2 draw. Portadown got one of the best European results in the league's recent history when they beat Skonto Riga 1–0 in Latvia, thus putting them through 2–1.

After beating Skonto Riga in the last round, Portadown faced Qarabag from Azerbaijan. They almost produced another shock in the first leg before ending up losing 2–1. In the second leg they earned a creditable 1–1 draw, but exited the competition 3–2 on aggregate. As second-placed finishers in last season's domestic league, Cliftonville entered in the second qualifying round, where they played HNK Cibalia from Croatia. In the first leg in Belfast they came out on top following a 1–0 win. In the second leg they held out for a 0–0 draw, going through 1–0 on aggregate.

In the third qualifying round, Cliftonville were drawn against Bulgarian giants CSKA Sofia. In the first leg in Sofia, Cliftonville were defeated 3–0, and were then defeated 2–1 in the second leg back in Belfast, losing the tie 5–1 on aggregate.

References

2010-11
North
1